Cêngdo (Chinese: 仓都; Pinyin: Cāngdū) is a township in Markam County, Chamdo Prefecture, Tibet Autonomous Region of China. 

It lies at an altitude of 4,042 metres (13,264 feet).

See also
List of towns and villages in Tibet

Notes

Populated places in Chamdo
Township-level divisions of Tibet